Buddy Brock is an American country music songwriter. His biggest hits to date are "Watermelon Crawl," co-written with Zack Turner, which reached the #4 spot on the Billboard Hot Country Songs chart and made the Billboard Hot 100 as a dance remix; and the 1992 song "There Ain't Nothin' Wrong with the Radio," co-written and performed by Aaron Tippin, which held the number 1 position on the country chart for three consecutive weeks in April and May, 1992. Other songs written or co-written by Brock include "I Wanna Fall in Love," a #3 country hit co-written with Mark Spiro for Lila McCann; "You've Got to Stand for Something" (co-written with and sung by Tippin), which reached #6 on the Billboard country chart); "Haunted Heart" (co-written with Kim Williams), a #9 country hit for Sammy Kershaw; and "I Wonder How Far It Is Over You" (co-written with and sung by Tippin), a top-40 country hit.

Notes

External links 
 Buddy Brock Top Songs/Charting Singles discography at MusicVF.com

Year of birth missing (living people)
Living people
American country songwriters
American male songwriters
Country musicians from Tennessee